Volo Festival is an annual festival celebrated by the chiefs and people of Akuse in the Volta Region of Ghana. It is usually celebrated in the month of March.

Celebrations 
During the festival, visitors are welcomed to share food and drinks. The people put on traditional clothes and there is durbar of chiefs. There is also dancing and drumming.

Significance 
This festival is celebrated to commemorate the end of the exodus of the people of Volo from Togo who were forced to flee from the tyranny of an impious ruler.

References 

Festivals in Ghana
Volta Region